Abby Trott is an American voice actress. She started out by acting in puppet shows in Japan, before moving to the United States and joining Bang Zoom! Entertainment, where she has worked on numerous anime, animation, and video game series. Some of her major roles include Nezuko Kamado in Demon Slayer: Kimetsu no Yaiba, Yoh Asakura in the Shaman King remake, and Maya Fey in Phoenix Wright: Ace Attorney – Spirit of Justice. She also performed the English version of the main theme of Super Smash Bros. Ultimate.

Biography
Abby Trott was born on May 8 in Attleboro, Massachusetts. Trott would later move to Tokyo, where she started professionally voice acting in puppet shows. In order to pursue a career in voice acting, she moved to New York City. In New York, she entered an online voice acting contest hosted by Bang Zoom! Entertainment, which she won. After winning, she moved to Los Angeles and began working as a voice actress.

In 2018, she performed the English version of "Lifelight", the song used as the main theme for the video game Super Smash Bros. Ultimate.

Filmography

Anime

Anime films

Animation

Video games

References

External links
 
 
 

Living people
Actresses from Massachusetts
American video game actresses
American voice actresses
People from Attleboro, Massachusetts
Year of birth missing (living people)
21st-century American actresses